Henock Abrahamsson (29 October 1909 – 23 April 1958) was a Swedish football goalkeeper who played for Gårda BK in the 1930s. He was capped in all of Sweden's three matches in the 1938 World Cup in France.

References

1909 births
Association football goalkeepers
Sweden international footballers
Swedish men's footballers
1938 FIFA World Cup players
1958 deaths